Six of Crows is a fantasy novel written by the Israeli-American author Leigh Bardugo and published by Henry Holt and Co. in 2015. The story follows a thieving crew and is primarily set in the city of Ketterdam, which is loosely inspired by Dutch Republic–era Amsterdam. The plot is told from third-person viewpoints of six different characters.

The novel is the first of a duology, completed in Crooked Kingdom (2016). The series is part of Bardugo's Grishaverse. Nina's storyline continues in the King of Scars duology: King of Scars (2019) and Rule of Wolves (2021), with the other Crows making brief cameos in the latter. They are also featured in the Netflix television series Shadow and Bone (2021), although the series follows an original storyline.

Plot
In Ketterdam, the capital of Kerch, Councilman Hoede tests a drug called jurda parem on a Grisha Healer. The drug enhances her abilities, allowing her to control and manipulate human minds. She escapes after paralyzing Hoede and some guards, but is found dead days later.

Wealthy merchant Jan Van Eck divulges the results of Hoede's experiment to 17-year-old criminal prodigy Kaz Brekker and tasks him with rescuing its inventor, Bo Yul-Bayur, from the Ice Court, an unbreachable military stronghold in Fjerda, and preventing the drug's existence from being exposed to the world. Kaz agrees for a hefty price and starts recruiting a crew: Inej Ghafa, his right-hand spy he had saved from a pleasure house called the Menagerie two years before; Nina Zenik, a Grisha Heartrender, who joins upon learning of his intention to free and employ Matthias Helvar, a former Fjerdan drüskelle (Grisha-hunter) detained at Hellgate Prison because of Nina; and Jesper Fahey, a Zemeni sharpshooter with a gambling addiction. Together, they break Matthias out of prison, who agrees to help in exchange for a pardon that would enable his reinstatement as a drüskelle. Kaz also enlists Wylan Van Eck, Jan Van Eck's runaway son, as a demolitions expert and leverage if Van Eck reneges on their deal. As they are about to sail from Ketterdam, the crew repels an ambush by rival gangs; after torturing a gangster, Kaz learns that gang leader Pekka Rollins, the man responsible for his brother Jordie's death, is also after the scientist. Kaz explains his rescue plan to the crew: they will enter the Ice Court as prisoners, cross to the embassy sector through the roof, and disguise themselves as foreign dignitaries during a festival. After finding and freeing Yul-Bayur from the White Island, on the inner ring, they will exit from the embassy sector.

Upon reaching Fjerda, two Grisha on jurda parem attack the group. The crew prevails, but Nina recognizes one of their assailants as an old friend and, troubled by the two Grisha's deaths, decides to stay behind to bury them. Matthias assists, letting them finally talk about her betrayal. Nina had been a Grisha soldier of the Ravkan Second Army captured by Matthias with his Fjerdan drüskelle party and put on a ship to Fjerda for trial and eventual execution. The ship sank during a storm, and Matthias and Nina fell in love while trying to find civilization. When they arrived at a city, Nina was questioned by Grisha spies about her drüskelle companion. To save Matthias from her compatriots, Nina reported him as a slave trader to a Kerch citizen in the harbor, unaware that Matthias would be imprisoned in Hellgate immediately after reaching Ketterdam. Instead of returning to Ravka, Nina stayed in Ketterdam to try and free him. Matthias reconciles with Nina upon learning the truth, and they agree to kill Yul-Bayur, both acknowledging that jurda parem is a threat to Grisha and Fjerdans alike.

The crew intercept a cart of prisoners being taken to the Ice Court and take the place of six of them. Due to the constant feeling of bodies pressing against him, Kaz loses consciousness, and more of his past is revealed. After he and his brother were conned by Pekka Rollins, a plague had swept through Ketterdam, killing many of its residents, including Jordie. Kaz fell ill and recovered but was mistakenly thought dead and tossed in the Reaper's Barge with the bodies for burning. He was only able to survive by swimming to shore using Jordie's corpse as a buoy. The experience created an intense aversion to any sort of physical contact with human skin, prompting him to wear gloves constantly. He wakes up as they enter the Ice Court. The crew is split as men and women are taken to different wards. Jesper, revealed to be a Grisha Fabrikator, fashions lock picks from the cell bars. Kaz frees Nina and Inej from their cells while Matthias and Jesper gather as much rope as they can find. Kaz goes with Nina to search the other holding cells for Yul-Bayur, and while split up, Kaz deviates from the plan and finds Pekka Rollins in a cell. Nina is spotted by guards, who manage to raise the alarm before she can kill them. She hurries to the basement, where Inej has scaled a six-story incinerator shaft to the roof, securing an escape route for the rest of the crew. With the prison alarm triggered, their plan is ruined, so they improvise to get to the center of the Ice Court. Inej and Nina get in by taking the place of two Menagerie girls, but only Nina gets through the guards; Inej is held back. Matthias and Kaz get in through a secret bridge known only to drüskelle. Jesper and Wylan move to destroy the ringwall gate and trigger the Ice Court's alarm.

While trying to coax information from a Fjerdan official, Nina is surprised to see Jarl Brum, leader of the drüskelle and the former commander of the ship that she was held captive in. Brum lures Nina into touring prison cells specifically constructed to detain Grisha and locks her in a cell. Matthias shows up, appearing to have betrayed her, but turns against his old commander and frees Nina, making a sacred drüskelle vow to keep her safe until he dies. They look for Bo Yul-Bayur, but learn of his death. His son, Kuwei Yul-Bo, is alive and is being forced to replicate his father's research. Matthias and Nina forgo killing him, as he is only fifteen and a Grisha. They take the boy and leave, blowing up the lab as they go. They meet up with Kaz and escape through a waterfall he unearthed. Meanwhile, Inej is spotted by the leader of the Menagerie, her former employer Heleen van Houden, who informs the guards of Inej's true identity. Jesper and Wylan rescue her and hijack a Fjerdan tank, using it to ram through the walls and escape. They head toward the dock to rendezvous with their ship and find a large Fjerdan party waiting for them, a Heartrender using parem at the fore. With no other choice, Nina takes jurda parem and subdues the army.

The crew safely reaches Ketterdam, with Nina already suffering from withdrawals. They leave her with Wylan, while the rest of the crew take Kuwei to Jan Van Eck. Van Eck, however, reveals that he only wanted the formula for jurda parem to profit from the fallout of its release to the world. He sinks the crew's ship despite Kaz's warning that Wylan is aboard. Van Eck reveals that he deems his son unfit to inherit his business empire, as Wylan is dyslexic. Kaz, however, reveals that the boy Van Eck thinks is Kuwei Yul-Bo is actually Wylan, tailored by Nina to look exactly like the scientist's son. Furious, Van Eck kidnaps Inej and gives them seven days to bring him the real Kuwei. Unwilling to endanger Inej, Kaz lets the merchant go. Kaz and his remaining crew go to Pekka Rollins, revealed to have been set free by Kaz at the Ice Court, and Kaz sells his shares in the Crow Club and the Fifth Harbour to raise the money he needs. He then hatches a plan to rescue Inej and redeem the money they were promised.

Characters

Kaz Brekker, also known as Dirtyhands, is seventeen and a master thief with a reputation for doing anything for the right price. He is second-in-command of the Dregs, and, as the mastermind of the group, the de facto leader of the Crows. He is haphephobic due to a traumatizing incident in his childhood and has a limp in his right leg from an improperly healed break.  He is described as very pale, with dark hair and dark brown eyes. He uses a cane with a crow's head top as a mobility aid and, occasionally, as a weapon.
Inej Ghafa is a sixteen-year-old Suli girl known as the Wraith. She is a spy for the Dregs, working directly under Kaz. She is religious, and her preferred weapons are knives, which she names after different saints. Her family was a travelling troupe and her act was tightrope walking, making her extremely agile and light-footed.  She was kidnapped by slavers when she was fourteen and forced into working in a brothel before Kaz bought her indenture. She's described as short, with bronze skin and black hair, worn in a braid.
Wylan Van Eck is a sixteen-year-old disowned merchant's son with a penchant for chemistry and demolition. He is dyslexic, and an excellent mathematician, chemist, and musician. He is described as having curly red-blonde hair, and pale skin.
Matthias Helvar is an eighteen-year-old former drüskelle (Grisha-hunter) from Fjerda, who is conflicted between his hatred for Grisha and his feelings for Nina. He is the oldest, tallest, and most muscular of the group, with pale skin, shaved blond hair, and blue eyes. He is religious and follows Djel, the Fjerdan god. 
Nina Zenik is seventeen, and is a powerful Grisha Heartrender and former soldier and spy for the Ravkan Second Army. She has fair skin, thick brown hair and green eyes, and is described as round and voluptuous.  
Jesper Fahey is a seventeen-year-old Zemeni sharpshooter with a gambling problem. He is described as being tall and lanky, with dark skin, and grey eyes. He is a Grisha but hides it to avoid being kidnapped or killed. 
Jan Van Eck is a rich man and a prominent merchant who sits on Ketterdam's Merchant Council. He is Wylan's abusive father.
Pekka Rollins is the leader of the Dime Lions gang and Kaz's main adversary.

Reception 
The New York Times recommends Six of Crows in the YA Crossover shortlist: "There’s conflict between morality and amorality and an appetite for sometimes grimace-inducing violence that recalls the "Game of Thrones" series. But for every bloody exchange there are pages of crackling dialogue and sumptuous description. Bardugo dives deep into this world, with full color and sound. If you’re not careful, it’ll steal all your time." It was also included in their "7 Great Fantasy Novels for Teenagers" list. The Hollywood Reporter likened the duology to a blend of Ocean's 11 and Game of Thrones."

The Guardian opined the plot was "bursting with action and overflowing with suspense right from the beginning...fast-paced...transitions between chapters and points of view were immaculate and really provided a sense of urgency and impact to the most significant scenes."

Although NPR books criticized the characters, claiming that the characters do not behave or think like adolescents, but rather display the wisdom and traits of much older people, it also comments "Six of Crows is a well-turned heist tale....[It] has a muscle car's drive and a cast that hangs with you like they were made of magnets" 

According to The Times of India, different perspectives in the book each provide an in-depth view of each character's traits and backgrounds. It further says, "Bardugo's language and her intelligent storytelling effectively makes The Six of Crows a white-knuckle page-turner."

It has been praised by various medias for its inclusivity and diversity, with characters who are LGBT, disabled, have different body types, and religious backgrounds, and are of different races.

Accolades

Awards and nominations
The awards and nominations are as follows:

Adaptations 

In January 2019, Netflix greenlit an eight-episode series based on Shadow and Bone (The Grisha Trilogy Book 1) and Six of Crows with Eric Heisserer as showrunner. Bardugo is also serving as an executive producer on this series. Production began in October 2019 with Freddy Carter as Kaz Brekker, Amita Suman as Inej Ghafa, Kit Young as Jesper Fahey, Danielle Galligan as Nina Zenik, and Calahan Skogman as Matthias Helvar. Wylan Van Eck did not appear in the first season but debuted in the second season, played by Jack Wolfe. The first season follows the plot of Book 1 of Shadow and Bone and acts as a prequel to Six of Crows, setting up a future adaptation of the novel. The second season adapts elements of Crooked Kingdom and sets up the Ice Court Heist plotline from Six of Crows.

References

External links
Leigh Bardugo's Website

2015 American novels
2015 fantasy novels
Amsterdam in fiction
Heist fiction
Henry Holt and Company books
Novels by Leigh Bardugo
Young adult fantasy novels
American novels adapted into television shows